Lightyear Entertainment, headquartered in Studio City, California, is a distributor of independent motion pictures in theaters, on DVD, Blu-ray, Video On Demand, as well as a distributor of music and music videos on CD, DVD, and digital distribution.

Lightyear releases movies into theaters directly.  After the theatrical run, digital distribution and licensing (including VOD, EST, SVOD and TV) in North America is now conducted through 1091 (formerly called The Orchard).  Physical distribution of DVDs and BluRays is through MVD Distribution.  From 2010 to 2018, both digital and physical releases were through eOne Distribution.  From 2008 to 2010, it was through Vivendi/Universal distribution, and, from 1995 to 2008, through Warner Home Video.  From 1991 to 1995, it was distributed through BMG.

Lightyear's music business in North America is conducted through Caroline Distribution/Universal Music Group.

Its origins were as a management buyout of RCA Video Productions, Inc. (a.k.a. RVP Productions) in 1987 from Bertelsmann, which was originally created in 1984.  The company was a co-producer of the Jane Fonda workout series, and pioneered in the areas of children's and music videos, as well as helping to create the fitness genre.  Lightyear is now again the distributor of the original Jane Fonda Workout videos on DVD and Digital.

Recent films distributed by Lightyear include Tanna (nominated for the Academy Award for Best Foreign Film in 2017), Maze, Jirga, The Hippopotamus, and Goldstone.  Other films include 16 Bars and The Etruscan Smile.

Lightyear's original productions include the films Aria, Heaven and The Return of Swamp Thing, as well as the Stories to Remember series of animated films for children.  It also produced concert films by Lou Reed, Eurythmics, Stevie Nicks, and Jefferson Starship, and the documentary Elvis '56.

Films

References

External links

Companies based in Los Angeles
Film distributors of the United States
Film production companies of the United States